Professor Avigdor Shinan is professor emeritus in the departments of Hebrew Literature, Yiddish and Comparative Jewish Folklore at the Hebrew University of Jerusalem. Shinan has served as head of the departments of General Studies, and of Hebrew Literature and as Dean of The Hebrew University. He has served as visiting Professor at Yale, JTS, and Yeshiva University and has also taught at Ben-Gurion, Tel-Aviv, and at the Schechter Institute.

Biography 
Born in Prague in 1946, he has been living in Israel since 1949. He completed his higher education at The Hebrew University, where he has been teaching since 1972 while engaged in his principal research fields: the literature of the Aggadah and the Midrash, the Aramaic translations of Scriptures and the history of the Siddur. He has published over 120 articles in these various fields and more than ten books including the Avi Chai Siddur, Pirkei Avot – A New Israeli Commentary, and, in collaboration with Prof. Yair Zakovitch That is not What the Good Book Says. Shinan also translated Yosef Dov Soloveitchik's books into Hebrew, and edited the popular journal "Et Ha-Da'at". He also serves as an academic consultant for Keren Avi Chai  and Beit Avi Chai in Jerusalem.

He retired in 2012.

References

Academic staff of the Hebrew University of Jerusalem
Israeli Hebraists
Czech emigrants to Israel
Israeli translators
Writers from Prague
Living people
Year of birth missing (living people)